First generation, Generation I or variants may refer to:

History
 1G, the first generation of wireless telephone technology
 First generation of video game consoles, 1972–1983
 First generation computer, a vacuum-tube computer

Music
 First Generation, an album by Van der Graaf Generator
 The First Generation, a 1990 compilation album by British band Sigue Sigue Sputnik

Science and technology
 First generation of three in the standard Model of particle physics 
 First-generation antihistamine, the oldest H1-antihistaminergic drugs
 First-generation programming language, any of a class of machine-level programming languages

Other
 First Generation (sculpture), a sculpture by Chong Fah Cheong
 First-generation immigrant, a citizen or resident who is an immigrant or has immigrant parents
 First-generation college students in the United States, college students whose parents did not attend college
 Transformers: Generation 1, toy line which ran from 1984 to 1992
 In Pokémon, see List of generation I Pokémon

See also
 Generation (disambiguation)
 Second generation (disambiguation)